Tongoona "TC" Charamba (born 2 February 1982) is a professional golfer from Zimbabwe.

Charamba was born in Harare, Zimbabwe. He won 12 amateur tournaments, including the Zimbabwe Amateur Matchplay and Stokeplay Championships in 2002, and led the Zimbabwe Order of Merit from 2000 to 2002, before turning professional in 2003.

Charamba became just the third black golfer to win on the Sunshine Tour when he claimed the SAA Pro-Am Invitational in 2006. In 2008, he won the MTC Namibia PGA Championship and finished a career best 27th on the Sunshine Tour Order of Merit. He has made more than R1,000,000 (around €90,000 or US$125,000) in total earnings on the tour.

Amateur wins
2002 Zimbabwe Amateur Stroke Play Championship, Zimbabwe Amateur Match Play Championship

Professional wins (2)

Sunshine Tour wins (2)

Sunshine Tour playoff record (1–1)

Team appearances
Amateur
Eisenhower Trophy (representing Zimbabwe): 2002

References

External links

Zimbabwean male golfers
Sunshine Tour golfers
Sportspeople from Harare
1982 births
Living people